Kalanka (Hindi: कलंका) is a mountain of Garhwal Himalaya in Uttarakhand, India. Kalanka stands at 6931 meter 22740 feet. It's the 20th highest located entirely within the Uttrakhand. Nanda Devi is the highest mountain in this category. Kalanka is the 48th highest peak in India and 319th highest peak in the world. Southern side of Kalanka is falls under Nanda Devi National Park.

Climbing history

Kalanka (6931m) lies on the outer rim of the Nanda Devi sanctuary and in between Changabang and Saf Minal. The first ascent by Ikuo Tanabe's four-member expedition from Japan in 1975 through the west ridge. They follow the Rishi Ganga gorge and crossed over to Shipton's col to gain the col between Changabang and Kalanka and climbed the west ridge. The first summit was reached by Noriaki Ikeda, Tsuneo Kouma, Kazumasa Inoue and the leader Tanabe on 3 June 1975. The first ascent of the north face was made in 1977 by Czechoslovak expedition, led by Frantisek Grunt, They approach the col through the Bagini glacier and the west ridge. Jozef Raconcaj and Ladislav Jon reached the summit on 20 September 1977.
The north face direct had been attempted many times but remained unclimbed until Fumitaka Ichimura, Kazuaki Amano and Yusuke Sato, of Japan, succeeded in alpine style in 2008.

Glaciers and rivers

It is surrounded by Glaciers on the three side Changabang Glacier, on the southern side, Uttari Rishi Glacier On the eastern side and Bagini Glacier on the northern side. The River from Bagini Glacier met with Dhauli Ganga at Jumma. Changabang Bamak (Glacier) and Uttari Rishi Bamak (Glacier) also met Dhauli Ganga through Rishi Ganga gorge. later Dhauli Ganga met with Alaknanda river at Vishnu Prayag two main tributaries of Ganga. These two main rivers meets at Devpryag. The name Ganga starts from their.

The entire surrounding area are protected within the  Nanda Devi National Park or Nanda Devi Biosphere Reserve which is a World Heritage Site declared by UNESCO . The Nanda Devi National Park is home to several world-class treks.

Neighboring peaks
neighboring peaks of Kalanka: 
 Nanda Devi: 
 Dunagiri: 
 Rishi Pahar: 
 Saf Minal: 
 Changabang:

See also
 List of Himalayan peaks of Uttarakhand
 Gangotri National Park
 Nanda Devi National Park

References

Mountains of Uttarakhand
Six-thousanders of the Himalayas
Geography of Chamoli district